José Ricardo Soares Ribeiro (born 11 November 1974), known as Soares, is a Portuguese former footballer who played as a winger, currently manager of G.D. Estoril Praia.

After a playing career spent almost entirely at the amateur level, he began managing in 2005, and took Vizela to the second tier eleven years later. He led Chaves, Aves, Moreirense, Gil Vicente and Estoril in the Primeira Liga, and had a brief spell at Al Ahly in Egypt.

Playing career
Born in Felgueiras, Soares' professional input as a player consisted of seven Segunda Liga games for his hometown club F.C. Felgueiras, over three seasons in as many spells. He amassed third division totals of 232 matches and 28 goals during his 12-year senior career, representing seven teams in the competition.

Coaching career

Early years, Vizela and Chaves
Soares started working as a manager in 2005 at the age of 30, with amateur side Clube Caçadores das Taipas. Having signed with F.C. Vizela in the summer of 2014, he achieved promotion to the second level at the end of the 2015–16 campaign.

On 18 December 2016, Soares was appointed at Primeira Liga club G.D. Chaves, replacing S.C. Braga-bound Jorge Simão. His first game took place four days later, a 1–0 home win against G.D. Estoril Praia.

Aves, Académica and Covilhã
In May 2017, Soares moved to another top-flight club, C.D. Aves on a two-year deal. He left on 2 October, with the team in last place on six points from eight matches.

Soares returned to the second tier on 14 November 2017, succeeding Ivo Vieira at Associação Académica de Coimbra. He left by mutual accord the following 1 April having won half of his 18 fixtures, and as the side was placed fifth and four points off a promotion place.

After over a year out of the game, Soares was hired by S.C. Covilhã on 20 May 2019, replacing F.C. Paços de Ferreira-bound Filó.

Moreirense and Gil Vicente
On 18 December 2019, with his Covilhã team ranked seventh, Soares returned to the top flight by succeeding sacked Vítor Campelos at the helm of Moreirense FC. He left the Parque de Jogos Comendador Joaquim de Almeida Freitas in November 2020, feeling he was not able to maximise his players' potential. 

Shortly after, Soares was appointed at Gil Vicente F.C. of the same league. In 2021–22, he led the team to fifth place and a European debut in the UEFA Europa Conference League.

Al Ahly
In June 2022, Soares moved abroad for the first time in his career, paying €250,000 to release himself from his Gil Vicente contract ahead of a two-year deal at Egypt's Al Ahly SC. His new annual salary was €1.5 million. On his debut on 2 July, the team won 2–0 at home to Petrojet SC in the semi-finals of the national cup; his Premier League bow was a goalless draw at El Gouna FC three days later.

In the cup final on 21 July 2022, Soares' side lost 2–1 to local rivals Zamalek SC, led by veteran compatriot Jesualdo Ferreira. He was dismissed on 31 August, having failed to take the league title back from the same adversary; having slipped behind a third Cairo side, Pyramids FC, Al Ahly finished outside the top two for the first time since 1991–92.

Estoril
Soares returned to Portugal and its main division on 28 February 2023, on a one-and-a-half-year contract at Estoril.

Managerial statistics

References

External links

1974 births
Living people
People from Felgueiras
Sportspeople from Porto District
Portuguese footballers
Association football wingers
Liga Portugal 2 players
Segunda Divisão players
F.C. Vizela players
F.C. Lixa players
S.C. Freamunde players
A.D. Lousada players
F.C. Felgueiras players
AD Fafe players
C.D. Trofense players
U.S.C. Paredes players
G.D.R.C. Os Sandinenses players
Portuguese football managers
Primeira Liga managers
Liga Portugal 2 managers
F.C. Vizela managers
G.D. Chaves managers
C.D. Aves managers
Associação Académica de Coimbra – O.A.F. managers
S.C. Covilhã managers
Moreirense F.C. managers
Gil Vicente F.C. managers
G.D. Estoril Praia managers
Egyptian Premier League managers
Al Ahly SC managers
Portuguese expatriate football managers
Expatriate football managers in Egypt
Portuguese expatriate sportspeople in Egypt